Mario Gimeno Alonso, simply Mario (born 5 October 1969), is a Spanish retired footballer who played as a midfielder.

External links
 

1969 births
Living people
Footballers from Madrid
Spanish footballers
Association football midfielders
Segunda División players
Tercera División players
Rayo Vallecano B players
Rayo Vallecano players
Spain under-21 international footballers
Spain under-23 international footballers